is a point and click adventure video game developed by Red Entertainment and published by Nintendo for the Nintendo DS. In Project Hacker: Kakusei, the player takes control of a hacker named Satoru Amatsubo. Both Satoru and detective partner Rina Okubo are employed by the internet crime-fighting GIS.

Gameplay
The game features hacker-themed puzzles where the stylus is used for, among other tasks, program repair and password cracking. Project Hacker plays like an adventure game outside of these puzzles, similar to the Ace Attorney series.

Development
Project Hacker: Kakusei was developed by Red Entertainment with involvement by publisher Nintendo. Creatures assisted on development. The game was initially announced under the title Detect Hacker at the 2005 DS Conference in Japan. The name was changed to Project Hacker in early 2006. In July 2006, one year after the game's Japanese launch, Nintendo of America filed copyrights for North American packaging and an instruction booklet for Project Hacker: Awakening, the English-translated title of the game. However, this localization never made it to release.

Reception
On release, Weekly Famitsu scored the game a 27 out of 40.

Sales
Project Hacker: Kakusei sold 37,000 copies in its launch week.

In other games
Satoru appears as a spirit in Super Smash Bros. Ultimate.

Notes

References

External links
Official game homepage (Japanese)
Official Nintendo Magazine article
IGN page
Joystiq article

2006 video games
Hacking video games
Japan-exclusive video games
Nintendo DS games
Nintendo DS-only games
Nintendo games
Red Entertainment games
Video games about police officers
Video games developed in Japan
Video games set in Tokyo
Multiplayer and single-player video games